François Bernardin Azaïs, known as Père Azaïs, (31 January 1870 – 6 April 1966) was a French missionary and archeologist. He has been called the "father of southern Ethiopian archeology."

He was born in Saint-Pons de Thomière (AD34, registre 5 MI74/10 vue n°145 acte n° 20), in the French department of Hérault on 31 January 1870. He became a Capuchin friar, and shortly thereafter expressed his desire to work as a missionary.

During his 30 years in Ethiopia (1897-1913 and 1922-1936), he conducted ten archeological expeditions in southern and eastern Ethiopia. Although only some of his findings were published (Cinq années de recherches archéologiques en Éthiopie), his unpublished research is stored at the Biblioteca Cappuccini in Rome, at the headquarters of his order.

He spent his later years as an ordinary brother in the Capuchin house at Toulouse, where he died on 6 April 1966 at the age of 96.

See also
Tiya (archaeological site)

References

1870 births
1966 deaths
People from Hérault
French Roman Catholic missionaries
Capuchins
French archaeologists
Archaeology of Ethiopia
Roman Catholic missionaries in Ethiopia
French expatriates in Ethiopia
+